The 100th (Prince of Wales's Royal Canadian) Regiment of Foot was a British Army regiment, raised in 1858. Under the Childers Reforms it amalgamated with the 109th Regiment of Foot (Bombay Infantry) to form the Prince of Wales's Leinster Regiment (Royal Canadians) in 1881.

History

The regiment, which was named after Prince Albert Edward, the future King Edward VII, was raised in Canada, to create extra military resources following the Indian Rebellion, in June 1858. It embarked for England later that year and was posted to Gibraltar in 1863 but moved to Malta later in the year. It returned to Canada in 1866 and took part in the ceremony for the inauguration of the Dominion of Canada on 1 July 1867, before returning to England in 1868.

In 1875 it was declared the successor to the 100th Regiment of Foot (Prince Regent's County of Dublin Regiment), which had served in Canada, and allowed to use the battle honour "Niagara". It embarked for Bengal in India in 1877.

As part of the Cardwell Reforms of the 1870s, where single-battalion regiments were linked together to share a single depot and recruiting district in the United Kingdom, the 100th was linked with the 109th Regiment of Foot (Bombay Infantry), and assigned to district no. 67 at Birr Barracks in Birr, County Offaly. On 1 July 1881 the Childers Reforms came into effect and the regiment amalgamated with the 109th Regiment of Foot (Bombay Infantry) to form the Prince of Wales's Leinster Regiment (Royal Canadians).

Battle honours
Battle honours won by the regiment were:
 Niagara (awarded in 1815 to 100th Regiment of Foot (Prince Regent's County of Dublin Regiment) and regranted to 100th (Prince of Wales's Royal Canadian) Regiment of Foot in 1875).

Colonels of the Regiment

Colonels of the Regiment were:
100th (or Prince of Wales's Royal Canadian) Regiment of Foot
1858–1862: Gen. Henry Dundas, 3rd Viscount Melville, GCB
1862–1872: Lt-Gen. Sir Edward Macarthur, KCB
1872: Maj-Gen. Charles Rochfort Scott
1872–1881: Gen. Hon. Sir Alexander Hamilton-Gordon, KCB

References

External links 

 Queen Victoria's Royal Canadians
 The Canadian Origins and Associations of The 100th (Prince of Wales's Royal Canadian) Regiment of Foot
 Historical sketch of the 100th Prince of Wales Royal Canadian Regiment
 THE LEINSTER REGIMENT

Infantry regiments of the British Army
Military units and formations established in 1858
Military units and formations disestablished in 1881